Dervishalikyshlak (also, Dervishalikyshlakh) is a village in the Khachmaz Rayon of Azerbaijan.

References 

Populated places in Khachmaz District